Ainos may refer to:

Aenus (Thrace), an ancient Greek city in Thrace, near the Aegean coast
Mount Ainos, on the island Cefalonia
Ainu people of Japan